This is a list of the French SNEP Top 100 Singles and Top 75 Albums number-ones of 2000.

Number-ones by week

Singles Chart

Albums Chart

Top Ten best sales

This is the ten best-selling singles and albums in 2000.

Singles

Albums

See also
2000 in music
List of number-one hits (France)
List of artists who reached number one on the French Singles Chart

References

2000 in French music
2000 record charts
Lists of number-one songs in France